Alexander Mitchell House may refer to:

Alexander Mitchell House (Salt Lake City, Utah), listed on the National Register of Historic Places (NRHP) in Salt Lake County
Alexander Mitchell House (Milwaukee, Wisconsin), listed on the National Register of Historic Places in Milwaukee County